is a railway station in the town of Onagawa, Miyagi Prefecture, Japan, operated by East Japan Railway Company (JR East).

Lines
Onagawa Station is a terminal station on the Ishinomaki Line, located 44.9 kilometers from the opposing terminus of the line at Kogota Station.

Station layout
The station has one bay platform, serving a single track, connected to the station building by a footbridge.

History
Onagawa Station opened on October 7, 1939. The station was absorbed into the JR East network upon the privatization of JNR on April 1, 1987. Operations were suspended after the tsunami on March 11, 2011 which destroyed the station building and nearby railway tracks.

Just over four years later, on March 21, 2015, the reconstructed Onagawa Station reopened marking the restoration of the entire Ishinomaki Line. The new station building features an integrated community center and public bathing facility on the upper floors. The building was designed by Pritzker Architecture Prize winning architect Shigeru Ban, who also contributed to the design of temporary housing structures in the town in the wake of the March 2011 tsunami.

Surrounding area

Before the tsunami disaster, a former JR East KiHa 40 series diesel multiple unit car, KiHa 40 519, was parked next to the "Yupoppo" onsen facility next to the station, for use as a lounge space.
Onagawa Port
Onagawa Post Office

Passenger statistics
In fiscal 2018, the  station was used by an average of 222 passengers daily (boarding passengers only).

See also
 List of railway stations in Japan

References

External links

 

Railway stations in Miyagi Prefecture
Ishinomaki Line
Railway stations in Japan opened in 1939
Onagawa, Miyagi
Stations of East Japan Railway Company
Shigeru Ban buildings